The German motorcycle Grand Prix, first held in 1925, is a part of the Grand Prix motorcycle racing World Championship since 1952. The event is due to take place at the Sachsenring until at least 2026.

History 

The first two Großer Preis von Deutschland races were held at Berlin's AVUS before moving to the new the purpose-built Nürburgring which was used in its full 28 km configuration. No GP was held in 1932, in 1933 the AVUS was given another try, and since 1934, public roads near and through Hohenstein-Ernstthal in Saxony were in use, initially without the name Sachsenring which had been used elsewhere. It was adopted in 1937.

After the war, in 1949, two German states were founded, and the FIM introduced a motorcycle World Championship in which neither Germans nor German race tracks could participate due to still being banned. In the (Western) Federal Republic of Germany, a strong motorcycle industry (NSU, DKW etc.) emerged in the early 1950s, as cars were not yet affordable. With the Sachsenring being now in the (Eastern) German Democratic Republic (GDR), a new venue had to be selected. The Nürburgring was damaged and due to its length not very suitable. The Solitudering near Stuttgart had a challenging layout and due to proximity of a major city, the crowds were large, but the narrow roads had to be widened. In 1953, the Schottenring near Fulda was chosen, but due to lack of safety, it was partially boycotted, and only the small classes races had WC status. Attendance at the Nürburgring, which was by now used in its 22.8 km Nordschleife configuration, was disappointing. Former DKW and NSU factory rider and world record setter Wilhelm Herz promoted the Hockenheimring successfully. Thus, with Hockenheim (in odd-numbered years) and Solitude, two tracks in the southwestern state of Baden-Württemberg shared the German GP until the mid-1960s, when the Solitude was abandoned and replaced by the Nürburgring. There, the lesser known 7.7 km Südschleife was used twice, as in the Eifelrennen races which often attracted international entrants, but that part of the track was not rebuilt in 1970/71; thus in the even years from 1970 to 1980, the famous Nordschleife was used.

In that time, also the "Grand Prix of the GDR", held on the Sachsenring, was part of the WC from 1961 to 1972. It is referred to as East German GP, EGER for short on the MotoGP website. During that period the German GP was also referred to as West German GP (WGER), even though its name never changed.

The popularity of motorcycles sharply fell in late 1950s Germany, as now everyone aspired to get an automobile. Only BMW survived, dominating side car racing. The East German brand MZ had made groundbreaking progress in two stroke technology, but due to defecting personnel and other problems, they fell behind in the late 1960s. After West German Dieter Braun won the East German race on the Sachsenring in 1971, the crowd sung the (West) German anthem, the "Deutschlandlied". To prevent further "demonstrations", the East German politicians, otherwise eager to gain international recognition, sacrificed the event's World Championship status, limiting entry of riders from Western states from 1972 onwards. With mainly riders from other Eastern bloc socialist states taking part, it was still called Großer Preis der DDR until 1977, when it was renamed Großer Preis des ADMV der DDR after the motorsports governing body.

In 1974, the event on the improved Nürburgring Nordschleife was boycotted by championship contenders as the track had not been fitted with enough straw bales. Traditionally, the Eifelrennen hosted motorcycle and automobile racing on the same weekend. Safety demands became problematic, as drivers asked for armco and catch fences, while rider safety requires unobstructed surroundings, with walls of straw bales in front of obstacles. With Agostini and others holding out, German amateur riders took all wins; with Edmund Czihak's win in the 500cc class remains the only race won by a German rider in the premier class (both in the 500cc era and the MotoGP era). The Eifelrennen in spring became an automobile event, and the GP became a separate event in August.

A few years later, in 1980, the last German GP was held on the Nordschleife, with the new GP track taking over in 1984.

The additional 1986 Baden-Württemberg Grand Prix (at Hockenheim) counted towards the WC only for 80cc and 125cc classes.

In 1998, after having become rather unpopular first at Hockenheim and then at Nürburgring due to the style of the promoters, the German motorcycle Grand Prix moved to new promoters, and to the shortened purpose-built Sachsenring where it became a sell-out event since.

The 2020 race was cancelled due to the outbreak of COVID-19.

Official names and sponsors 
The names that are included are from both West and East Germany.

1952–1956, 1958, 1964–1988, 1990: Großer Preis von Deutschland (no official sponsor, West Germany)
1957, 1961, 1963: Großer Preis von Deutschland für Motorräder (no official sponsor, West Germany)
1959: Intern. Rhein-Pokal (no official sponsor, West-Germany)
1962–1972: Großer Preis der Deutschen Demokratischen Republik (no official sponsor, East Germany)
1989, 1991: Großer Preis von Deutschland für Motorräder (no official sponsor, West Germany until 1990)
1992: Großer Preis von Deutschland Motorräder (no official sponsor)
1993: Grand Prix von Deutschland (no official sponsor)
1994–1995: Grand Prix Deutschland (no official sponsor)
1996: Warsteiner Motorrad Grand Prix Deutschland
1997: ADAC Motorrad Grand Prix Deutschland
1998–1999: Polini Motorrad Grand Prix Deutschland
2000–2003: Cinzano Motorrad Grand Prix Deutschland
2004: VELTINS Motorrad Grand Prix Deutschland
2005, 2007–2009: Alice Motorrad Grand Prix Deutschland
2006: betandwin.com Grand Prix Deutschland
2010–2014: eni Motorrad Grand Prix Deutschland
2015–2017: GoPro Motorrad Grand Prix Deutschland
2018: Pramac Motorrad Grand Prix Deutschland
2019: HJC Helmets Motorrad Grand Prix Deutschland
2021–present: Liqui Moly Motorrad Grand Prix Deutschland

Spectator attendance 
2006: 93,748

Track gallery

Winners of the motorcycle Grand Prix of Germany

Multiple winners (riders)

Multiple winners (manufacturers)

By year
A pink background indicates an event that was not part of the Grand Prix motorcycle racing championship.

Winners of the East German motorcycle Grand Prix

Multiple winners (riders)

Multiple winners (manufacturers)

By year

A pink background indicates an event that was not part of the Grand Prix motorcycle racing championship.

References 

 
Recurring sporting events established in 1925
1925 establishments in Germany